An equestrian statue of Sebastián de Belalcázar was installed in Popayán, Colombia in the 1930s, until it was toppled by protestors in 2020.

References

1930s establishments in Colombia
Equestrian statues
Monuments and memorials in Colombia
Monuments and memorials removed during the George Floyd protests
Outdoor sculptures
Sculptures of men
Statues in Colombia
Vandalized works of art
Statues removed in 2020